The 2007 Southern Illinois Salukis football team represented Southern Illinois University as a member of the Gateway Football Conference during the 2007 NCAA Division I FCS football season. They were led by seventh-year head coach Jerry Kill and played their home games at McAndrew Stadium in Carbondale, Illinois. The Salukis finished the season with a 12–2 record overall and a 5–1 record in conference play. The team received an at-large bid to the FCS playoffs, where they defeated Eastern Illinois and UMass before losing to Delaware in the semifinals. Southern Illinois was ranked No. 3 in The Sports Network's postseason ranking of FCS teams.

Schedule

References

Southern Illinois
Southern Illinois Salukis football seasons
Southern Illinois Salukis football